The following article sorts the 107 urban districts (Kreisfreie Städte – cities that constitute districts in their own right) and the metropolitan districts of Hanover, Aachen and Saarbrücken by their gross domestic product in the year 2018. Most figures are from the Federal Statistical Office of Germany; figures from other sources are otherwise referenced. The GDP of German cities are shown in EUR€.

List of metropolitan regions 

The 11 metropolitan regions in Germany by their gross domestic product in 2014.

See also 

 Economy of Germany
List of German states by GRP
List of German states by GRP per capita

References 

GDP
Germany